Sarpol-e Zahab (Sarpole Zahâb; , ; also romanized as Sarpol-e Z̄ahāb, Sar-e Pol-e Z̄ahāb, and Sar-ī-Pūl Zūhāb; also known as Pol-e Z̄ahāb, Sarpole-Zahab, Pol-e Z̄ohāb, Sarī-Pūl, and Sarpol) is a city and capital of Sarpol-e Zahab County, Kermanshah Province, Iran, close to Qasr-e Shirin and the Iraqi border. At the 2006 census, its population was 34,632.

Demographics 
The city is populated by Kurds.

Reliefs 
The area of Sar-e Pol-e Zahab has several more or less well preserved reliefs of the Lullubi kingdom, as well as a Parthian relief.

Lullubian reliefs
The most famous of these reliefs is the Anubanini rock relief. Another relief named Sar-e Pol-e Zohab I is about 200 meters away, in a style similar to the Anubanini relief, but this time with a beardless ruler. The attribution to a specific ruler remains uncertain. There are also other Lullubian relief in the same area of Sar-e Pol-e Zahab.

Parthian relief
Another relief is located below the Anubanini relief, lower on the cliff. This relief was created during the Parthian Empire in the name of Gotarzes, possibly Gotarzes I, but more probably the Parthian king Gotarzes II, who ruled from 39 to 51 CE and is known to have made other reliefs, such as the equestrian relief at Behistun.

See also
Taq-e Gara
Gilan-e Gharb

References

Populated places in Sarpol-e Zahab County
Cities in Kermanshah Province
Rock reliefs in Iran
Kurdish settlements in Kermanshah Province